The 2015 Gimcheon Open ATP Challenger was a professional tennis tournament played on hard courts. It was the second edition of the tournament which was part of the 2015 ATP Challenger Tour. It took place in Gimcheon, Korea between 1 and 7 June 2015.

Singles main-draw entrants

Seeds

 1 Rankings are as of May 25, 2015.

Other entrants
The following players received wildcards into the singles main draw:
  Lee Duck-hee
  Lee Jea-moon
  Kim Young-seok
  Kwon Soon-woo

The following players used protected ranking to gain entry into the singles main draw:
  Karunuday Singh

The following players received entry from the qualifying draw:
  Jang Woo-hyeok
  Blake Mott
  Na Jung-woong
  Christopher O'Connell

Doubles main-draw entrants

Seeds

1 Rankings as of May 25, 2015.

Other entrants 
The following pairs received wildcards into the singles main draw:
 Kim Jae-hwan /  Na Jung-woong
 Kwak Sung-hyuk /  Um Eun-sik
 Masamichi Imamura /  Hiroki Koshimizu

Champions

Singles

 Alexander Sarkissian def.  Connor Smith, 7–6(7–5), 6–4

Doubles

 Li Zhe /  Jose Rubin Statham def.  Dean O'Brien /  Ruan Roelofse, 6–4, 6–1

External links

Gimcheon Open ATP Challenger
Gimcheon Open ATP Challenger
2015 in South Korean tennis